Scatter the Crow is the debut album from Slaves to Gravity. The album was released on March 31, 2008. The album has garnered 4 singles each of which also having videos: "Big Red", "Meantime", "Mr. Regulator" and "Doll Size".

Track listing
 "Heaven is a Lie" - 4:30
 "She Says" - 3:46
 "Big Red" - 3:45
 "Meantime" - 3:22
 "Too Late" - 3:30
 "Doll Size" - 4:01
 "LG Halo" - 5:02
 "My Poor Hand" - 5:34
 "Gutterfly" - 5:26
 "Mr. Regulator" - 3:37
 "Burning Robe" - 2:30
 "Pluto" - 4:11
 "Rosa & The Ocean Blue" - 3:45

2008 debut albums
Slaves to Gravity albums